Cobitis hellenica is a species of ray-finned fish in the true loach family (Cobitidae). It is endemic to Greece.

It belongs to the subgenus Bicanestrinia, together with C. arachthosensis, C. meridionalis and C. trichonica. According to cladistic analysis of DNA sequence data (nDNA RAG-1 and S7 ribosomal protein intron 1, and mtDNA cytochrome b), the first of these is an extremely close relative and might arguably be included in the present species. C. arachthosensis is only found in the Arachthos River basin, parapatric to the range of C. hellenica.

Its natural habitats are the Louros and Thyamis River basins. It is threatened by habitat loss.

Footnotes

References
 
 
  (2008): Cobitis species. Version of 2008-MAY-03. Retrieved 2008-AUG-15.
  (2008): The molecular diversity of adriatic spined loaches (Teleostei, Cobitidae). Mol. Phylogenet. Evol. 46(1): 382–390.  (HTML abstract)

Cobitis
Freshwater fish of Europe
Endemic fauna of Greece
Fish described in 1996
Epirus (region)
Taxa named by Teodor T. Nalbant
Taxonomy articles created by Polbot